In chemistry, bond energy (BE), also called the mean bond enthalpy or average bond enthalpy is a measure of bond strength in a chemical bond. IUPAC defines bond energy as the average value of the gas-phase bond-dissociation energy (usually at a temperature of 298.15 K) for all bonds of the same type within the same chemical species.

The bond dissociation energy (enthalpy) is also referred to as
bond disruption energy, bond energy, bond strength, or binding
energy (abbreviation: BDE, BE, or D). It is defined as the standard
enthalpy change of the following fission: R  - X → R + X. The BDE,
denoted by Dº(R - X), is usually derived by the thermochemical
equation,

The enthalpy of formation ΔHfº of a large number of atoms, free radicals, ions,
clusters and compounds is available from the websites of NIST,
NASA, CODATA, and IUPAC. Most authors prefer to use the
BDE values at 298.15 K.

For example, the carbon–hydrogen bond energy in methane BE(C–H) is the enthalpy change (∆H) of breaking one molecule of methane into a carbon atom and four hydrogen radicals, divided by four. The exact value for a certain pair of bonded elements varies somewhat depending on the specific molecule, so tabulated bond energies are generally averages from a number of selected typical chemical species containing that type of bond.

Bond energy (BE) is the average of all bond-dissociation energies of a single type of bond in a given molecule. The bond-dissociation energies of several different bonds of the same type can vary even within a single molecule. For example, a water molecule is composed of two O–H bonds bonded as H–O–H. The bond energy for H2O is the average of energy required to break each of the two O–H bonds in sequence:

Although the two bonds are the equivalent in the original symmetric molecule, the bond-dissociation energy of an oxygen–hydrogen bond varies slightly depending on whether or not there is another hydrogen atom bonded to the oxygen atom.

When the bond is broken, the bonding electron pair will split equally to the products. This process is called homolytic bond cleavage (homolytic cleavage; homolysis) and results in the formation of radicals.

Predicting the bond strength by radius
Metallic radius, ionic radius, and covalent radius of each atom in a molecule can be used to estimate the bond strength. For example, the covalent radius of boron is estimated at 83.0 pm, but the bond length of B–B in B2Cl4 is 175 pm, a significantly larger value. This would indicate that the bond between the two boron atoms is a rather weak single bond. In another example, the metallic radius of rhenium is 137.5 pm, with a Re–Re bond length of 224 pm in the compound Re2Cl8. From this data, we can conclude that the bond is a very strong bond or a quadruple bond. This method of determination is most useful for covalently bonded compounds.

Factors affecting ionic bond energy
The electronegativity of the two atoms bonding together affects ionic bond energy. Greater differences in electronegativity correspond to stronger ionic bonds.

See also
Binding energy
Ionization energy
Isodesmic reaction
Lattice energy

References

Energy
Binding energy